Tiran (c. 300/305 – 358 AD) known also as Tigranes VII, Tigranes or Diran was an Armenian prince who served as a Roman client king of Arsacid Armenia from 339 until 350. He was a contemporary of and is associated with the life of Sarkis the Warrior and his son, Martiros.

Ancestry 
Tiran was among the children born to Khosrov III Kotak by an unnamed mother, and was thus a grandson of Tiridates III of Armenia and his wife, Ashkhen. He was the maternal uncle of Nerses I who would become the future Catholicos-Patriarch of Armenia. Tiran was named in honour of the monarchs named Tigranes of the Artaxiad dynasty. The name Tigranes was the most common royal name in the Artaxiad dynasty and was among the most ancient names of the kings of Armenia.

Reign

Internal policy 
When his father died in 339, Tiran succeeded his father as King of Armenia. Little is known of his life prior to this. Tiran was a lukewarm Christian and was the first Arsacid ruling monarch to aggressively pursue a policy on Arianism. Although Tiran was endorsed by the Christian aristocrats of Armenia, the King was a disappointment, intellectually and morally. The reign of Tiran was blemished by conflicts both internally and externally.

Tiran antagonised the clergy and the great Mamikonian family, who had been the mainstay of the throne. He had many disagreements with the reigning Catholicos and his relation Husik I, who had criticised Tiran on his public and private conduct. This led Tiran to order the death of Husik, who was beaten to death on Tiran's orders, because the Catholicos denied him entry to a church in Sophene on a feast day in 347. Tiran massacred two leading Armenian families, the Ardzruni and Reshtuni, whom he accused of having secret relations with the Sassanids, and tried unsuccessfully on various occasions to crush the power of the Armenian feudal lords.

Foreign policy 
Tiran's foreign policy was mainly concerned with the Sassanid King Shapur II. Shapur launched a war on Rome and her allies, firstly by persecuting the Christians in Persia and Mesopotamia. By capturing these territories, Shapur's war dealt a severe blow to Roman prestige in the East.

Shapur invaded Armenia with his army and eventually took Tiran, his Queen and their family as hostages. Tiran and his family were betrayed by his chamberlain to Shapur. Tiran and his family became Sassanid political prisoners. Tiran was blinded and thrown into prison, after he was accused by Shapur of collusion with Rome.

The Armenian nobles, infuriated by the brutality of Shapur II and his treatment of Tiran and his family, took up arms and fought against Shapur and his army with assistance from the Romans. They successfully drove Shapur and his army out from Armenia. After Shapur was defeated, he signed a treaty and agreed to release Tiran and his family from prison. As Tiran was depressed and blinded, he abdicated his throne and his second son Arsaces II, succeeded him father as king of Armenia in 350.

Family 
Tiran married an unnamed woman by whom he had three sons and a daughter, who were: Artaxias, Arsaces II, Tiridates and Eranyak. 

Tiran's first-born son, Artaxias (died before 350), had a son called Tirit.

References

Sources
 The Armenian Church - The Eastern Diocese of the Armenian Church of America - The Saints: St. Sarkis the Warrior and His Son, St. Mardiros
 Encyclopaedia Iranica: Armenia and Iran II. The pre-Islamic period
 Translations from the Armenian: Mihran Kurdoghlian, Badmoutioun Hayots, A. hador [Armenian History, volume I], Athens, Greece, 1994, pg. 108
 M. Chahin, The Kingdom of Armenia: A History, Routledge, 2001
 R.G. Hovannisian, The Armenian People from Ancient to Modern Times, Volume 1: The Dynastic Periods: From Antiquity to the Fourteenth Century, Palgrave Macmillan, 2004 
 A. Terian, Patriotism And Piety In Armenian Christianity: The Early Panegyrics On Saint Gregory, St Vladimir's Seminary Press, 2005
 V.M. Kurkjian, A History of Armenia, Indo-European Publishing, 2008

See also
 Saint Sarkis the Warrior

4th-century kings of Armenia
Roman client kings of Armenia
3rd-century Christians
4th-century Christians
Arsacid kings of Armenia